Diana Hertha Golze (née Gnorski; born 18 June 1975) is a German politician from Die Linke. She was a Member of the Bundestag from 2005 to 2014.

Career 
She resigned from the Bundestag on 6 November 2014.

She was Health Minister of Brandenburg until 2018.

References 

Living people
1975 births
21st-century German women politicians
Female members of the Bundestag
Members of the Bundestag for Brandenburg
Members of the Bundestag for The Left
Members of the Bundestag 2005–2009
Members of the Bundestag 2009–2013
Members of the Bundestag 2013–2017

Ministers of the Brandenburg State Government